Örebro SK are a Swedish football team which based in Örebro. During the 2014/15 campaign they competed in the Allsvenskan, Swedish Cup.

Competitions

Allsvenskan

References

External links 
 

Örebro SK seasons
Swedish football clubs 2015 season